Karakol is a lake in Yrgyz District, Aktobe Region, Kazakhstan.

Geography
Karakol belongs to the Shalkarteniz basin. It is connected to Shalkarteniz via a channel at the eastern end. The lake basin is fed by snow. The water increases its salinity in the summer months and the bottom is flat and muddy. 

Very close to the southeast lies larger lake Kurdym. River Shonkai (Шоңқай), a branch of the last stretch of the Turgay, flows to the southwest. Reeds grow on the lakeshore. The area near the lake is a seasonal grazing ground for local cattle.

See also
List of lakes of Kazakhstan

References

External links

Shalkar-Nura - An Arid Wilderness and Saiga Sanctuary

Lakes of Aktobe Region
Shalkarteniz basin